The women's field hockey tournament at the 2004 Summer Olympics was the 7th edition of the field hockey event for women at the Summer Olympic Games. It was held over an eleven-day period beginning on 16 August, and culminating with the medal finals on 26 August. All games were played at the hockey centre within the Hellinikon Olympic Complex in Athens, Greece.

Germany won the gold medal for the first time after defeating the Netherlands 2–1 in the final. Argentina won the bronze medal by defeating China 1–0.

Qualification
Each of the continental champions from five federations received an automatic berth. Along with the five teams qualifying through the Olympic Qualification Tournament, ten teams competed in this tournament.

Although the host nation would have qualified automatically as well, the International Hockey Federation (FIH) and the International Olympic Committee (IOC) refused to give them an automatic berth due to the standard of hockey in Greece. Greece appealed the decision to the Court of Arbitration for Sport (CAS), however it was turned down. Greece's first option to gain a place at the Olympics was by qualifying for the EuroHockey Nations Championship held in 2003. As they did not qualify for this tournament their last option was to beat Russia, the last ranked team of the Olympic Qualification Tournament in a best of three play-off competition. Russia would have kept its place in the Qualifier regardless of whether it won or lost against Greece. There would, however, have been four places at stake at the tournament if Greece had qualified, rather than five. Eventually Greece withdrew from participating due to explicit financial reasons.

Umpires

Rosters

Results
All times are Eastern European Time (UTC+2)

Preliminary round

Pool A

Pool B

Classification round

Ninth and tenth place

Fifth- to eighth-place classification

Crossover

Seventh and eighth place

Fifth and sixth place

First- to fourth-place classification

Semi-finals

Bronze-medal match

Gold-medal match

Statistics

Final ranking

Goalscorers

References

External links
Official FIH website

 
Women's tournament
2004
2004 Summer Olympics
2004 in women's field hockey